The 2009 FIA WTCC Race of Morocco (formally the 2009 FIA WTCC HSBC Race of Morocco) was the third round of the 2009 World Touring Car Championship season. It was held on 3 May 2009 at the Marrakech Street Circuit in Marrakech, Morocco. It was the inaugural running of the FIA WTCC Race of Morocco.

The two races were won by Chevrolet's Robert Huff and Nicola Larini, the former taking the first win for the Chevrolet Cruze in the World Touring Car Championship.

Background
After the previous round in Mexico, Yvan Muller was tied at the top of the drivers' standings with SEAT Sport teammate Rickard Rydell. Félix Porteiro had established a 23 point lead over Tom Coronel in the Yokohama Independents' Trophy.

This was the first FIA World Championship race to be held in Morocco since the 1958 Moroccan Grand Prix. The WTCC saw its first North African driver participate in an event when Mehdi Bennani joined the grid in an Exagon Engineering run SEAT León 2.0 TFSI.

Other changes were made to Scuderia Proteam Motorsport expanded to three cars for Morocco to run a BMW 320si for Vito Postiglione, and Tom Boardman requested a new car which wouldn't have been ready for the Moroccan event so he elected to skip the round and focus on returning for the Race of France.

Report

Testing and free practice
Yvan Muller topped the times as the WTCC cars took to the Marrakech Street Circuit for the first time in Friday's test session. He was closely followed by Chevrolet's Alain Menu and SEAT Sport team mate Rydell.

SEAT Sport stayed on top in free practice one on Saturday morning, forming a SEAT 1–2–3–4–5 with Menu sixth. Coronel in seventh was the fastest independent driver and Jörg Müller in eighth was the fastest factory BMW car, Nicola Larini and Stefano D'Aste rounded out the top ten.

Yvan Muller topped the afternoon session with SEATs filling the top six places. Menu was sixth ahead of Huff and the fastest BMW was that of independent driver Franz Engstler.

Qualifying
Chevrolet's Huff beat practice pace setters SEAT in qualifying to claim pole position, the first for the new Cruze car. Gabriele Tarquini started second and Yvan Muller third. Despite setting the second fastest lap, Menu was demoted to 10th because the Stewards disallowed his Q2 qualifying times after his car did not restart following a mandatory visit to the weighing bay.

In Q1, SEAT had company at the top of the qualifying timesheet in the form of Chevrolet. While Tiago Monteiro initially made claim to pole with a 1:51.086, Menu (1:50.271), Larini (1:50.723) and Huff (1:50.817) stole the top spots. The end of the session saw Andy Priaulx miss his braking point at turn 1 and clash with Hernández who had come off his line to let Zanardi through. Due to the fact he received external aid to restart, Priaulx was not permitted to take part in Q2 and therefore qualified ninth following Menu's penalty. All of the LADA drivers remained out of Q2. Despite not making Q2, Moroccan driver Mehdi Bennani put in a strong performance to qualify 14th overall and second of the Independents.

In Q2, the session ended prematurely for Jörg Müller who suffered a rear left puncture after six minutes. He did not post a competitive qualifying time and lined up eighth for Race 1. The pack was tight and at one point during the session just four tenths of a second
split the top six. On the last lap Huff charged to the front with a 1:49.789. Tarquini clocked a 1:50.086 on his last lap to secure a front-row place and Muller's best time was 1:50.156. Muller lined up third followed by Jordi Gené, Larini and Monteiro. Engstler qualified as best Independent and BMW driver in seventh, while Menu's qualifying session ended when he hit the wall at turn 2 on his last
lap.

Warm-Up
Yvan Muller topped the warm–up session on Sunday morning with fellow SEAT drivers Gené second, Coronel third, Tarquini fourth and Monteiro fifth. Jörg Müller was the leading BMW while pole sitter Huff was eighth.

Race One
Robert Huff converted his pole into a win for Chevrolet, the first for the new Cruze car in its fifth race. Huff led the field from the start to finish with Gabriele Tarquini behind him the whole way to take second. Jordi Gené overtook Yvan Muller on the penultimate lap to secure third. Farfus' team-mate Jörg Müller was the fastest BMW and his eighth place finish meant pole in Race 2. Fellow BMW driver Alessandro Zanardi retired from the race on lap four.

The safety car was deployed at the end of the first lap after an incident involving Müller, Alain Menu and Rickard Rydell resulted in Rydell being squeezed into the wall at turn two and incurring race-ending damage to his car.

Moroccan driver Mehdi Bennani was best Independent in ninth overall, while Augusto Farfus was challenged hard by Tom Coronel for 12th position, but in the end, Coronel made a mistake at turn 11 on lap 10 and lost the battle.

Race Two
The second race saw Nicola Larini celebrate his first ever WTCC win. Yvan Muller took second place ahead of Race 1 winner Robert Huff. Jörg Müller led until lap eight when he went wide at turn 15 allowing Larini, Muller and Huff through. The BMW Team Germany driver eventually finished fourth ahead of Tarquini, Farfus and Monteiro. Franz Engstler took the final point in eighth as well as the Independent win. Andy Priaulx was in contention for points until lap 11 where he missed the braking point at turn 7 – he retired to the pits on the next lap.

Mehdi Bennani also went straight at the same point on lap 11 but continued to finish 10th and third independent. The safety car was deployed for two laps at the start after Hernández's car was stranded in an unsafe place.

Results

Qualifying

Race 1

Bold denotes Fastest lap.

Race 2

Bold denotes Fastest lap.

Standings after the event

Drivers' Championship standings

Yokohama Independents' Trophy standings

Manufacturers' Championship standings

 Note: Only the top five positions are included for both sets of drivers' standings.

References

External links
Results Booklet PDF at MST Systems

FIA WTCC Race of Morocco
Morocco
FIA WTCC Race of Morocco